KRMH (89.7 FM) is a high school radio station broadcasting a variety music format and licensed to Red Mesa, Arizona, United States. The station is owned by the Red Mesa Unified School District and operated by Red Mesa High School.

References

External links
 
 Page on Red Mesa HS site

RMH
High school radio stations in the United States